The siege of Carlisle may refer to:

United Kingdom 
Siege of Carlisle (1315), Andrew Harclay, 1st Earl of Carlisle, drove off Robert I of Scotland from a siege of Carlisle
Siege of Carlisle (1644), Covenanters besiege but fail to take Carlisle, being held by Royalist James Graham, 1st Marquess of Montrose
Siege of Carlisle (1645), Covenanters under Alexander Leslie, 1st Earl of Leven, besiege and take Carlisle from a Royalist garrison in 1645
Siege of Carlisle (November 1745), the Jacobite Army under Charles Edward Stuart besiege and take Carlisle
Siege of Carlisle (December 1745), British forces under the Duke of Cumberland besiege and retake Carlisle

See also 
 Battle of Carlisle (1863), Pennsylvania, United States